Moawad may refer to:

Moawad GadElrab (1929–1983), Egyptian physician, artist, writer, author and professor
Hassan Sayed Moawad (died 2007), Egyptian basketball player
Kayssar Moawad, Lebanese physician and politician
Michel Moawad, Lebanese politician who resigned from Parliament in protest after the 2020 Beirut Explosion
Mohamed Moawad (born 1987), Egyptian male volleyball player
Nayla Moawad (born 1940), Lebanese politician and former First Lady of Lebanon
Nazli Moawad, Egyptian political science professor at Cairo University
René Moawad (1925–1989), Lebanese politician who served as the 9th President of Lebanon
Sayed Moawad (born 1979), Egyptian retired professional footballer
Wajdi Moawad, OC, (born 1968), Lebanese-Canadian writer, actor, and director

See also
René Moawad Garden, known as the Sanayeh Garden, located in the Sanayeh district of Beirut, Lebanon
Mouawad
Mowad